Morus Elfryn (c. 1948 – 22 March 2022) was a Welsh musician, television production manager and carpenter. Described by Gruff Rhys as a "maverick singer", he recorded for the Welsh-language label Sain in the 1970s and later worked on S4C programmes including C'mon Midffîld!.

Career
Morus Elfryn was from Pontsiân, Ceredigion. He was educated at Ysgol Dyffryn Teifi, where he attracted notice as a rugby player. He then attended college in High Wycombe before returning to Wales. As a teenager, Elfryn started performing music as part of the folk trio Y Cwiltiaid. The group released three EPs on the Qualiton and Cambrian labels between 1967 and 1970.

In the early 1970s, Elfryn was a member of the satirical band Y Dyniadon Ynfyd Hirfelyn Tesog. After the group split following the death of leader Gruff Miles, Elfryn formed a duo, Morus Elfryn a Nerw,  with fellow member Gareth "Nerw" Hughes Jones. The duo released the EP, Heibio'r Af, on Sain in 1974. Elfryn's only solo album, I Mehefin (Lle Bynnag y Mae), was released on Sain in 1975. Tracks from I Mehefin were later included on Welsh Rare Beat (2005) and Welsh Rare Beat 2 (2007), compiled by Andy Votel, Dom Thomas and Gruff Rhys. Gruff Rhys has described Elfryn as a "Celtic Gene Pitney" whose songs "always weave an atmospheric narrative reminiscent in subject matter to Scott Walker or Jacques Brel".

Characterised by Dafydd Iwan as a private and family-oriented man, Elfryn retired from live performances in 1985 and moved to working in television. From the 1980s, he was a production manager with Ffilmiau'r Nant and worked on S4C programmes including the popular sitcom C'mon Midffîld! and Pengelli. He was later involved in the soap opera Rownd a Rownd. He was described as "Mr Fixer in the television world" by Dafydd Iwan. In later years, Elfryn moved to Waunfawr near Caernarfon. A carpenter by trade, he resumed his carpentry in retirement, making and selling furniture. He reunited with Gareth "Nerw" Hughes Jones for a live performance in 2015, his first in 30 years.

After a short illness, Elfryn died at Ysbyty Gwynedd on 22 March 2022, aged 73. In 2023, Elfryn's son Dei auctioned a quilt of beer towels from C'mon Midffîld! in his father's memory, with proceeds going to a cancer charity.

References

1940s births
2022 deaths
20th-century Welsh male singers
Welsh male singers
Welsh-language singers
Welsh folk singers
Welsh folk music
People from Ceredigion
Year of birth uncertain